Retilaskeya emersonii is a species of sea snail, a gastropod in the family Newtoniellidae, which is known from the northwestern Atlantic Ocean. It was described by C.B. Adams in 1839.

Description 
The maximum recorded shell length is 11.4 mm.

Habitat 
Minimum recorded depth is 0 m. Maximum recorded depth is 70 m.

References

 Abbott, R.T. (1974). American Seashells. 2nd ed. Van Nostrand Reinhold: New York, NY (USA). 663 pp.
 Rolan E. & Espinosa J. (1992) La familia Cerithiopsidae H. y A. Adams, 1853 (Mollusca, Gastropoda), en la isla de Cuba. 1. El genero Retilaskeya Marshall, 1978. Publicacoes Ocasionais da Sociedade Portuguesa de Malacologia 16: 39-44. [January 1992]

External links
 Adams, C. B. (1839). Observations on some species of the marine shells of Massachusetts, with descriptions of five new species. Boston Journal of Natural History. 2: 262-288, pl. 4
 Emmons E. (1858). Report of the North Carolina Geological Survey. Agriculture of the Eastern Counties. Together with descriptions of the fossils of the Marl Beds. Henry D. Turner, Raleigh. xvi + 314 pp.
  Gardner, J. (1948). Mollusca from the Miocene and Lower Pliocene of Virginia and North Carolina part 2. Scaphopoda and Gastropoda. United States Geological Survey Professional Paper. 199-B: 179-310

Newtoniellidae
Gastropods described in 1839